"The Dragon", by the Iraqi poet Abd al-Wahhab Al-Bayyati (1926–1999), was originally published in 1996.  The translation by Farouk Abdel Wahab, Najat Rahman, and Carolina Hotchandani is from the volume Iraqi Poetry Today (c) 2003, edited by Saadi Simawe.

"The Dragon" is an example of al-Bayyati's frequent incorporation of mythological figures into his poetry.

See also
 Iraqi literature
 1996 in poetry

External links 
 Text of "The Dragon" with commentary and links

1996 poems
Dragons in popular culture